Bharani (Devanagari: भरणी) is the second nakshatra in Hindu astronomy, corresponding to 35, 39, and 41 Arietis all together. In Jyotiṣa, Bharani is ruled by Shukra (the planet Venus).
Also, it is classified as a Cruel or Active nakshatra, meaning that, under electional astrological beliefs, works of a harmful or deceptive nature are best conducted while the moon is Bharani.

Bharani is seen as being under the domain of Yama, the god of death or Kālī. 

Traditional Hindu given names are determined by which pada (quarter) of a nakshatra the Ascendant/Lagna was in at the time of birth. The given name would begin with the following syllables:
A (pronounced as in "agglutination")
 Ee (pronounced as in "Eel")
 Li (pronounced as in "little")
Lu (pronounced as in "look")
Le (pronounced as in "levity")
Lo (pronounced as in "local")

See also
List of Nakshatras

References

Nakshatra